Clover Downtown Historic District is a national historic district located at Clover, York County, South Carolina. It encompasses 14 contributing buildings in the central business district of Clover. The buildings are predominantly one to three-story masonry commercial buildings built between the mid-1880s and about 1935.

It was added to the National Register of Historic Places in 1999.

References

Historic districts on the National Register of Historic Places in South Carolina
Commercial buildings on the National Register of Historic Places in South Carolina
Buildings and structures in York County, South Carolina
National Register of Historic Places in York County, South Carolina